Hendrella variegata is a species of tephritid or fruit flies in the genus Hendrella of the family Tephritidae.

Distribution
India.

References

Tephritinae
Insects described in 1984
Diptera of Asia